Veerakamba  is a village in the southern state of Karnataka, India. It is located in the Bantwal taluk of Dakshina Kannada district in Karnataka.

Demographics
 India census, Veerakamba had a population of 5063 with 2521 males and 2542 females.

See also
 Mangalore
 Dakshina Kannada
 Districts of Karnataka

References

External links
 DC Office

Villages in Dakshina Kannada district